Ghassem Khan Vali (1878–1933), otherwise and better known by his military title of Sardar Homayoun, the son of Ali Khan Vali and grandson of  was the first Imperial Iranian Army general to graduate from the prestigious Saint-Cyr Military School in France, which was founded by Napoléon in 1802.

Life 
During the Overthrow of the Qajar dynasty, Sardar Homayoun was encouraged by the local politicians and moderates, backed by Edmund Ironside, 1st Baron Ironside and the British Government, to become the Shah of Persia (his ancestry as a member of the Qajar dynasty supported his claim to the throne). He declined out of his loyalty to Ahmad Shah, although it was stated that it was out of his fear for his family's safety and his moral reluctance to use force against his countrymen, a measure which was inevitable for the maintenance of the monarchy. His reluctance was seen as cowardice by the British, who later gave the position to Reza Shah Pahlavi. During Reza Shah's reign, Vali was appointed commander of the Cossack Division in Northern Iran. He was the first Mayor of Tabriz in 1908, (see list of Tabriz Mayors), and as a modern man, he was at the origin of the first electrical generator to Tabriz. He also introduced the first metallic printing press in Iran. Sardar Homayoun also was one of the first modern economists in Iran. He retired soon after to his family's estate to pursue writing and farming. An aristocrat by birth, he believed in the character conferred by military education and discipline.

Family 
His cousin, Doust Mohammad Khan Moayer ol-Mamalek, was the son-in-law of Nasser al-Din Shah who married his daughter Princess Esmat os-Saltaneh. He had five daughters and two sons. His sons, Ebrahim and Ali Vali, also served in the Imperial Iranian Army as generals during the reign of Mohammad Reza Shah.

References 

Black Coup
Iran and the Rise of Reza Shah: From Qajar Collapse to Pahlavi Power - by Cyrus Ghani - p.140
The Zarrinkafsch (Bahman-Qajar) Family

External links

Imperial Iranian Army major generals
École Spéciale Militaire de Saint-Cyr alumni
1870s births
1933 deaths
Mayors of Tabriz